Parabacteroides goldsteinii  is a Gram-negative, obligately anaerobic non-spore-forming and non-motile bacterium from the genus of Parabacteroides which has been isolated from human blood.

References 

Bacteroidia
Bacteria described in 2006